Naubat Khan (also known as Ali Khan Karori) was an Indian classical music composer, musician and instrumentalist who was made a Mansabdar by Mughal Emperor Akbar. He is known today for his skills with the rudra veena or bīn, which he is shown playing in paintings by Mughal court artists.Naubat Khan  was the contemporary and son in law of legendary Tansen.

Early life and background
Naubat Khan was the grandson of Raja Samokhan Singh of Kishangarh. Samokhan Singh, a Jodhpur prince, was himself a great veena player of his time.

As the Mughal Emperor Akbar fought his wars of conquest in India, he fought against Raja Samokhan Singh. Singh was defeated in the battle and his grandson Misri Singh (Naubat Khan) was kept under house arrest. Misri Singh later accepted Islam and was named Ali. He was trained under Abdul Rahim Khan-I-Khana, the son of Bairam Khan to get an understanding of the Mughal court procedures. Ali was given the title of Khan by Mughal Emperor Akbar, and the post of Karori, i.e. Collector of revenue. He was later given the prestigious position of the darogha of the Naqqar Khana. As mentioned in Tuzk-e-Jahangiri, Ali Khan Karori was given the title of Naubat Khan and promoted to the rank of 500 personnel and 200 horse on 9 July 1607 (Gregorian), or 14 Rabi ul Awwal 1016 (Hijri), during Jahangir's visit to Kabul.

Marriage
Mughal Emperor Akbar himself arranged the marriage of Naubat Khan to Tansen's daughter, Saraswati. Saraswati accepted Islam and was named Hussaini. They had a son named Lal Khan. Lal Khan was the son-in-law of Tansen's son Bilas Khan. Lal Khan would become the chief musician of Emperor Shahjahan. Shahajahan conferred on him the title of Gunsamundra.

Subject of individual portrait

Only highly ranked figures of the court enjoyed the privilege of being painted alone or within an assembly by the painters of the court and Naubat Khan is one of the rare musicians – along with the illustrious singer-composer Tansen – to have been the subject of an individual portrait. Both Tansen and Naubat Khan were individually immortalized by artists of the Imperial atelier during the reign of Mughal Emperor Akbar.

A well-known portrait of Naubat Khan painted during Akbar's reign and attributed to the artist Mansur, is held in the British Museum.  Another tinted drawing of him is in the Museum of Fine Arts, Boston and yet another from the Edwin Binney 3rd Collection is presently held in the San Diego Museum of Art.

In a fourth portrait of Naubat Khan, part of a Double Sided Muraqqa Folio, Naubat Khan is shown playing a rudra vina, or bin, with its large round orange gourds, wearing an Akbar period white muslin chakdar (four pointed) jama with a small white kulhadar (an early Akbar-style turban) on his head. The reverse side of the image has calligraphic nasta'liq script. It contains a work of poetry (possibly Sufi poetry), reading:

 "chand gu'i ze koja'i o koja
 az nahan-khaneh-ye tajridam o az deyr fana
 to jadal mi-koni amma che-koni chun na-koni
 goft haqq dar haqq-e to akthar-e shay' jadala".
 
Translation:
 
 "How many times will you ask: Where are you? Where are you? Where?
 I am from the closet of separation and from the transitory world.
 You dispute, but what will you achieve if you do not?
 He said: Truth, you will always be the cause of disagreement".

Beenkar dynasty

Naubat Khan was the founder of the beenkar or binkar dynasty of India. His direct descendants commanded respect in musical circles for several centuries. Notable members of this family are
 Lal Khan Gunsamundra (chief musician of Shahjahan, son-in-law of Tansen's son Bilas Khan)
 Khushal Khan Gunsamundra (title of Gunsamundra conferred by Shahjahan, chief musician at the court of Mughal Emperor Shahjahan and Mughal Emperor Aurangzeb).
 Bisram Khan (son of Lal Khan Gunsamundra, One of the Chief musicians at the court of Mughal Emperor Shahjahan and Mughal Emperor Aurangzeb).
 Bhupat Khan
 Sadarang (chief musician of Mughal Emperor Muhammad Shah)
 Adarang
 Sidhar Khan
 Omrao Khan Beenkar
 Ameer Khan
 Wazir Khan (Master of Nawab Hamid Ali Khan of Rampur, Allauddin Khan, Hafiz Ali Khan, Vishnu Narayan Bhatkhande)
 Dabir Khan

See also
Hindustani classical music
Sadarang

References

Indian male classical musicians
Mughal nobility
Akbar
Indian Shia Muslims
Year of birth missing
Year of death missing